Deborah Liu is an American technology executive and CEO of Ancestry.com. 
Liu serves on the board of Intuit and Women in Product.

Education and life
Liu is of Chinese descent. She is a graduate of Duke University (B.S.E in Civil Engineering) and Stanford Business School.

Career
Liu was director of product for the end-to-end buyer experience at eBay and spearheaded the integration between eBay and PayPal. She was director of product marketing management and product management at PayPal.

In 2009, she joined Facebook, where she worked on Facebook Credits and Facebook Platform and helped build their mobile app install ad business. In 2016, as VP of product development, she founded Facebook Marketplace and became VP of marketplace in 2017.

After being at Facebook for 11 years, Liu joined Ancestry.com as its CEO, effective March 1, 2021.

She was included on Business Insider's list of "The Most Powerful Female Engineers" and PaymentsSource's list of "The Most Influential Women in Payments", and is a member of the Committee of 100.

In August 2022, she published her first book "Take Back Your Power: 10 New Rules for Women at Work".

Liu is a seed investor and advisor to startups.

References 

Living people
EBay employees
Facebook employees
PayPal people
American computer businesspeople
American technology chief executives
21st-century American businesswomen
21st-century American businesspeople
Year of birth missing (living people)
Duke University alumni
Stanford Graduate School of Business alumni